The Desha Vimukthi Janatha Pakshaya (DVJP) (National Liberation People's Party) is a political party in Sri Lanka. It is currently a member of the Socialist Alliance and the Sri Lanka People's Freedom Alliance. 

The party's general secretary is D. Kalansooriya.

History
The DVJP was founded in 1988. 

During the last legislative elections on 2 April 2004, the party was part of the United People's Freedom Alliance, which won 45.6% of the popular vote and 105 out of 225 seats.

Political parties in Sri Lanka
Socialist Alliance (Sri Lanka)
United People's Freedom Alliance
1988 establishments in Sri Lanka
Political parties established in 1988
Socialist parties in Sri Lanka